The Montgomery City-County Public Library is a library system of eleven branches serving the citizens of Montgomery County, Alabama. The system is composed of the Juliette Hampton Morgan Memorial Library and ten other branches.

History

Montgomery Library Association

Library service began on June 19, 1899, when a collection was started above McBryde's Drugstore on Dexter Avenue. Funds were gathered largely from a promotion by the Montgomery Advertiser. The Montgomery Library Association was by subscription membership of $1.00 Miss Laura M. Elmore was the city's first librarian.

Carnegie Library
First free public library in Montgomery. Laying of the cornerstone took place in 1902. Holdings included about 2,000 books in 1904. By December 25, 1910, the library's holdings had increased to 10,000 with 5,000 registered borrowers.

City of Montgomery Library
On April 5, 1949 the library became managed by the City of Montgomery with the transferral of its deeds and property from the Montgomery Library Association.

Montgomery City-County Public Library System
In 1974 the City and County Public library systems merged to become the Montgomery City-County Public Library System. The city retained full management responsibility over the system.

Governance
The Montgomery City-County Public Library is governed by the Library Board of Trustees.

Services

Collections
Alabamiana & Rare Book Collection
Arms & Military Collection
Descriptive Video Collection

eBook & eMagazine Services
The Montgomery City-County Public Library offers the following audiobook, e-book, and eMagazine services:

 OverDrive eBooks & eAudiobooks

Branches
E L Lowder Regional Library
Rufus A. Lewis Regional Library
Coliseum Boulevard Branch Library
Governors Square Branch Library
Bertha Pleasant Williams Library — Rosa L. Parks Avenue Branch (named after Bertha Pleasant Williams (1923–2008), the first black professional librarian in Montgomery)
Pintlala Branch Library
Extension Service & Outreach Department
Hampstead Library
Pike Road Branch Library
Pine Level Branch Library - Closed in 2015 
Ramer Branch Library

Further reading
Greenhaw, Wayne.  Montgomery the River City, Montgomery, Alabama: River City Publishing, 2002.

External links
Montgomery City-County Public Library Website
Questplex website
MCCPL Blog

References

County library systems in Alabama
Education in Montgomery County, Alabama